Gisburn Tunnel is a short railway tunnel on the Ribble Valley line in Lancashire, England. The tunnel was reputedly built at the behest of Lord Ribblesdale, who didn't want the railway across his land.

History 
Previous to this, the railway had a temporary terminus in Gisburn railway station. Full opening of the line to passengers occurred on 1 June 1880. The extension  of the East Lancashire Railway (by that time, the Lancashire and Yorkshire Railway) needed to go through Lord Ribblesdale's estate (Gisburn Park). Ribblesdale refused to allow the railway to cross his grounds in case it frightened his horses, so a cut-and-cover castellated tunnel was built instead, and the course of the railway was altered from the plans so that the trackbed could not be seen from Gisburne Hall. The castellated entrances to the tunnel were built when Ribblesdale refused the compensation money from the railway company, with Ribblesdale instead asking that the money be spent on the look of the tunnel portals over normal brick edifices.

In 2018, Network Rail undertook a refurbishment programme to restore the stonework on the portals of the tunnel. The project cost £100,000 and was nominated in the 2018 National Railway Heritage Awards. Whilst the tunnel itself is not listed, both portals are (grade II listed), being noted for their use of local stone, with Liverpool red sandstone dressings, and castellated nature with octagonal turrets.

The line through the tunnel is an important freight artery, and serves as a useful diversionary route when the West Coast Main Line is closed.

Portal locations 
Western portal:  - grade II listed.
Eastern portal:  - grade II listed.

See also
Listed buildings in Gisburn

References

Sources

External links 
Map of the location
Location of the tunnel in relation to the surrounding railways (at 2c on the map)

Railway tunnels in England